The following highways are numbered 806:

Costa Rica
 National Route 806

United States